Turner Creek is a stream in the U.S. state of Wisconsin. It is a tributary to the East Fork Black River.

Turner Creek has the name of a pioneer landowner.

References

Rivers of Wood County, Wisconsin
Rivers of Wisconsin